Kasapa FM is a privately owned urban, lifestyle radio station, which focuses on music, entertainment/lifestyle-led talk programmes and sports. Kasapa FM  is a multilingual radio station that broadcasts from Feroah Avenue, Adabraka, Accra, the capital of Ghana, and can be listened both on 102.5 FM and online.  The station is owned by former Ghana Finance Minister Kwabena Duffuor.

References

External links 
 Official website

Radio stations in Ghana
Greater Accra Region
Mass media in Accra